Bachleda is a Polish surname typical for Goral population of Zakopane region. Notable people include:

 Alicja Bachleda-Curuś (born 1983), Polish actress
 Andrzej Bachleda (born 1947), Polish alpine skier
 Andrzej Bachleda (born 1975), Polish alpine skier
 Jan Bachleda (1951-2009), Polish alpine skier
 Katarzyna Bachleda-Curuś (born 1980), Polish speed skater
 Klemens Bachleda (1851-1910), Polish mountain guide and mountain rescuer
 Marcin Bachleda (b. 1982), Polish ski jumper

See also
 

Polish-language surnames